The Fog Bay and Finniss River Floodplains comprise the floodplain of the lower reaches of the Finniss River with the adjoining intertidal mudflats of Fog Bay in the Top End of the Northern Territory of Australia.  It is an important site for waterbirds.

Description 

The floodplain is mainly seasonally inundated paperbark and sedge swamps. The bay is dominated by sand, salt and mudflats with a shoreline of mangroves and mangrove-lined channels, grassed dunes and patches of samphire.

Fog Bay 

The town of Dundee Beach is at the north-east end of the bay. The coastline includes the mouth of the Finniss River, which enters around the middle of the bay. The coast north of the mouth is mostly sandy flats, whereas south of the Finnis the coastline is made up of intertidal mud flats backed by mangroves.

The Fog Bay and Finniss River Floodplains have been identified as an Important Bird Area.

Birds 

The site has been identified as an Important Bird Area (IBA) by BirdLife International.  The floodplain supports over 1% of the world populations magpie geese and pied herons.  The mudflats of Fog Bay, extending from Point Jenny to Stingray Head, support over 1% of the world populations of great knots and grey-tailed tattlers, among the maximum of 35,000 waders, or shorebirds, recorded.  Other waders for which the site is at least sometimes important include black-tailed godwits, greaters and lesser sand plovers, grey plovers, Terek sandpipers, and Far Eastern curlews.  Other waterbirds that have been recorded in relatively large numbers include little pied and little black cormorants, darters, royal spoonbills, glossy, straw-necked and Australian white ibises, great and intermediate egrets, plumed and wandering whistling ducks, grey teals, Pacific black ducks, and brolgas.

References 

Important Bird Areas of the Northern Territory
Wetlands of the Northern Territory
Rivers of the Northern Territory
Bays of the Northern Territory
Floodplains of Australia